Ramiz Shaban Brahimaj  (born November 17, 1992) is an American mixed martial artist who competes in the Welterweight division of the Ultimate Fighting Championship.

Background

Brahimaj started training seriously for MMA when he was 17 while he was a junior in high school. He had always loved fighting and always loved the UFC.

Brahimaj is the son of Kosovar-Albanian parents.

Mixed martial arts career

Early career
In his MMA debut, he faced Richard Bailey and submitted him via rear-naked choke in the first round. Brahimaj also tapped out his next three opponents that included wins over Josh Sturgill and David Lopez. Then in his promotional debut with Legacy Fighting Alliance at LFA 28, he submitted Sidney Ben Simmons in round one. Brahimaj tapped out Bilal Williams via rear-naked choke in the first round at LFA 33. He lost his first bout against Evan Cutts at LFA 40 via unanimous decision.

Brahimaj faced UFC veteran William Macário at LFA 47 and won by way of guillotine choke in the second round. After losing to Justin Patterson at LFA 55 via unanimous decision, Brahimaj tapped out Carlos Martinez in the first round via arm-triangle choke at LFA 62.

After being booked against Miguel Baeza on Dana White's Contender Series, a tumor was found behind his left eye in his prelimary testing for the bout and had to have surgery to remove it.

Ultimate Fighting Championship
Brahimaj was scheduled to face Takashi Sato on June 27, 2020  at UFC on ESPN: Poirier vs. Hooker  but the fight was scratched due to one of Brahimaj's cornermen testing positive for COVID-19.

Brahimaj made his UFC debut against Max Griffin on November 7, 2020 at UFC on ESPN: Santos vs. Teixeira. He lost the fight via technical knockout due to a doctor stoppage after Brahimaj's ear was split open in round three.

Brahimaj faced Sasha Palatnikov on August 21, 2021, at UFC on ESPN: Cannonier vs. Gastelum. He won the fight via technical submission due to a rear-naked choke in round one.

Brahimaj faced Court McGee on January 15, 2022 at UFC on ESPN: Kattar vs. Chikadze. He lost the fight via unanimous decision.

Brahimaj, as a replacement for Jonny Parsons, faced Michael Gillmore on February 26, 2022 at UFC Fight Night: Makhachev vs. Green. He won the fight via rear-naked choke submission in round one.

Brahimaj was scheduled to face Michael Morales on July 30, 2022 at UFC 277. However, Brahimaj was forced out the event in mid July due to an undisclosed injury.

Brahimaj was scheduled to face Carlston Harris on February 18, 2023,  at UFC Fight Night 219. However, Brahimaj was pulled from the event citing neck injury.

Mixed martial arts record

|-
|Win
|align=center| 10–4
|Micheal Gillmore 
|Submission (rear-naked choke)
|UFC Fight Night: Makhachev vs. Green
|
|align=center|1
|align=center|2:02
|Las Vegas, Nevada, United States
|
|-
|Loss
|align=center| 9–4
|Court McGee
|Decision (unanimous)
|UFC on ESPN: Kattar vs. Chikadze
|
|align=center|3
|align=center|5:00
|Las Vegas, Nevada, United States
|
|-
|Win
|align=center| 9–3
|Sasha Palatnikov
|Technical Submission (rear-naked choke)
|UFC on ESPN: Cannonier vs. Gastelum
|
|align=center|1
|align=center|2:33
|Las Vegas, Nevada, United States
|
|-
|Loss
|align=center|8–3
|Max Griffin
|TKO (doctor stoppage)
|UFC on ESPN: Santos vs. Teixeira
|
|align=center|3
|align=center|2:03
|Las Vegas, Nevada, United States
|  
|-
|Win
|align=center|8–2
|Carlos Martinez
|Submission (arm-triangle choke)
|LFA 62
|
|align=center|1
|align=center|0:55
|Dallas, Texas, United States
|
|-
|Loss
|align=center| 7–2
|Justin Patterson
|Decision (unanimous)
|LFA 55
|
|align=center|3
|align=center|5:00
|Dallas, Texas, United States
| 
|-
|Win
|align=center| 7–1
|William Macário
|Technical Submission (guillotine choke)
|LFA 47
|
|align=center|2
|align=center|2:34
|Dallas, Texas, United States
|
|-
|Loss
|align=center| 6–1
|Evan Cutts
|Decision (unanimous)
|LFA 40
|
|align=center|3
|align=center|5:00
|Dallas, Texas, United States
|
|-
|Win
|align=center| 6–0
|Bilal Williams
|Submission (rear-naked choke)
|LFA 33
|
|align=center|1
|align=center|4:10
|Dallas, Texas, United States
|
|-
|Win
|align=center| 5–0
|Ben Simons
|Submission (guillotine choke)
|LFA 28
|
|align=center|1
|align=center|0:46
|Dallas, Texas, United States
|
|-
|Win
|align=center| 4–0
|Josh Sturgill
|Submission (guillotine choke)
|XKO 37
|
|align=center|1
|align=center|0:24
|Dallas, Texas, United States
|
|-
|Win
|align=center| 3–0
|Andrew Sosa
|Submission (rear-naked choke)
|XKO 36
|
|align=center|1
|align=center|0:55
|Dallas, Texas, United States
|
|-
|Win
|align=center| 2–0
|David Lopez
|Submission (kimura)
|XKO 34
|
|align=center|1
|align=center|0:20
|Dallas, Texas, United States
|
|-
|Win
|align=center|1–0
|Richard Bailey
|Submission (rear-naked choke)
|GCS 1: The Commencement
|
|align=center|1
|align=center|2:17
|Abilene, Texas, United States
|

See also 
 List of current UFC fighters
 List of male mixed martial artists

References

External links 
  
  

1992 births
Living people
American male mixed martial artists
Welterweight mixed martial artists
Ultimate Fighting Championship male fighters
American people of Kosovan descent